The 2006–07 Montenegrin Cup was the first season of the Montenegrin knockout football tournament since Montenegro achieved independence. The winner of the tournament received a berth in the first qualifying round of the 2007–08 UEFA Cup. The competition featured 30 teams. It started on 3 October 2006 and ended with the on 30 May 2007. The first winner of the competition was Rudar, who beat Sutjeska in the final.

First round
Last Republic Cup's finalists was received a bye to the Second Round. The remaining 14 matches were played on 3 and 4 October 2006.

Summary

|}

Matches

Bracket

Second round
The first legs were played on 18 October and the second legs were played on 31 October and 1 November 2006.

Summary

|}

First legs

Second legs

Quarter-finals
The first legs were played on 15 November and second on 29 November 2006.

Summary

|}

First legs

Second legs

Semi-finals
The first legs were played on 25 April and second on 16 May 2007.

Summary

|}

First legs

Second legs

Final

References

External links
Montenegrin Cup 2006-2007 (pages 57-62) at Football Association of Montenegro's official site
Montenegrin Cup 2006-2007 at Soccerway
Montenegrin Cup 2006-2007 at RSSSF

Montenegrin Cup seasons
Cup
Montenegrin Cup, 2006-07